Bawgali is a town in Hpa-an District, Kayin State of Myanmar. According to 2014 Myanmar Census, the total population in Bawgali is 17,237.

References 

Populated places in Kayin State